This is the discography of English-American singer-songwriter Lene Lovich.

Albums

Studio albums

Compilation albums

Video albums

EPs

Singles

References

Discographies of British artists
Rock music discographies
New wave discographies